is a  mountain, in Matsusaka, Mie, Japan.

Outline 
Mount Hinokizuka Okumine is one of Daikō Mountains. It is the tallest mountain of mountains in Mie Prefecture, which are not on the border with other prefectures.

Route 

To the top of Mount Hinokizuka Okumine, there are two major routes. One is from Maakodani Tozanguchi, it takes two hours and 15 minutes. The other is via Myōjindaira and Mount Myōjin. It takes two hours and 40 minutes from the nearest parking space. If public transportation is used, it takes another 70 minutes from Ōmata Bus Stop of Nara Kōtsu.

Access 
Ōmata Bus Stop of Nara Kōtsu

Gallery

References
Ōdaigahara, Takami, Kurosoyama, Shobunsha, 2008
Official Home Page of the Geographical Survey Institute in Japan

Mountains of Mie Prefecture